Örserum Church is a church building at  Örserum in Jönköping County, Sweden. It is situated along the road east of Gränna.
The church is part of the  Gränna Parish in the Diocese of Växjö the Church of Sweden. The church was completed in 1937  after drawings by architect Johannes Dahl (1886-1953).

References

20th-century Church of Sweden church buildings
Churches in Jönköping Municipality
Churches completed in 1937
Churches in the Diocese of Växjö